Murat Nausbievich Kardanov (born January 4, 1971, in Zaragij village, Kabardino-Balkaria) is a Russian wrestler and Olympic champion in Greco-Roman wrestling.

During his career Kardanov won gold medals in Russian Championships 4 times (1992, 1993, 1998, 2000), in European Championships (1998) and Olympic Games (2000). He also took bronze medal in World Championships (1993).

Awards
 Order For Merit to the Fatherland IV class (2000)
 Order of Honour (Russian Federation) (2001)
 Honored Master of Sports of the Russia (2000)

References

External links
 sports-reference.com

1971 births
Living people
People from Kabardino-Balkaria
Circassian people of Russia
Olympic wrestlers of Russia
Wrestlers at the 2000 Summer Olympics
Russian male sport wrestlers
Olympic gold medalists for Russia
Olympic medalists in wrestling
World Wrestling Championships medalists
Medalists at the 2000 Summer Olympics
Sportspeople from Kabardino-Balkaria
20th-century Russian people
21st-century Russian people